Benjamin "BeBe" Winans (born September 17, 1962) is an American gospel and R&B singer. He is a member of the noted Winans family, most members of which are also gospel artists. Winans has released nine albums, seven with his sister CeCe as BeBe & CeCe Winans and one with three Winans brothers.

The PTL Club
Winans released several albums, first with his sister CeCe, and later as a solo artist. Jim Bakker's television show The PTL Club took interest in BeBe and his sister CeCe as background vocalists for the show. After going to North Carolina to audition they were accepted. The siblings moved to the PTL campus in North Carolina, and were on the show for about five years.

During their time on PTL, BeBe and CeCe recorded "Lord Lift Us Up" on PTL's label after popular demand on the show. Eventually the success warranted another effort: a full-length album. The album did well on the charts. BeBe and CeCe left PTL to pursue their singing career and recorded five albums together including self-titled BeBe & CeCe Winans, Heaven, Different Lifestyles, First Christmas and Relationships. In 1995, BeBe and CeCe split up to pursue solo careers. But in 2009 they did the album "Still" together. On it was the song "Close to You," which won a Dove award in 2010 in the category of Urban Recorded Song.

Solo career
In 1989, BeBe won his first Grammy for Best Soul Gospel Performance, Male for his contribution to "Abundant Life", a track on his brother Ronald's Family & Friends Choir.

BeBe signed with Atlantic records in late 1996 and delivered a self-titled solo debut in 1997. The album featured the singles "In Harms' Way", "Thank You", and the international crossover hit "I Wanna Be the Only One" featuring British soul trio Eternal. The song topped the UK Singles Chart in Eternal's native United Kingdom in May 1997.

The next album released was the fruit of a new deal with Motown Records. Love & Freedom was released in 2000 and featured production from Warryn Campbell, Brian McKnight, Masters At Work and others. The lead single "Coming Back Home" was a slow swinging ballad featuring R&B luminaries McKnight and Joe. Another single was BeBe's remake of the Stevie Wonder classic "Jesus Children of America" featuring his older brother Marvin (The Winans, Winans family) and Stevie Wonder himself.

Two years later, a live album Live & Up Close followed. The album was recorded live at BET studios and featured guests such as his sister Debra Winans-Lowe and Stephanie Mills. The set was released on both CD & DVD. The CD included the studio version of "Do You Know Him?" which served as the album's first single.

By 2003, BeBe had started his own record label, The Movement Group, and partnered with Still Waters, an inspirational and gospel imprint of Hidden Beach Recordings. The first album under this deal was 2004's largely orchestral holiday album entitled My Christmas Prayer which first appeared exclusively for sale at Starbucks coffee shops nationwide. Between releases, BeBe made his film debut with a small role in the 2004 remake (featuring Denzel Washington) of The Manchurian Candidate.

Early the next year, BeBe released his third proper solo album Dream featuring the single "I Have A Dream". The song featured samples of the historic speech by Martin Luther King, and was released to several radio stations to coincide with King's birthday celebrations.  The cover of the album features a hand painted portrait of BeBe standing in front of a Martin Luther King Jr Blvd. street sign. Also "Miracle Of Love," a duet with Angie Stone included on the album, also appeared on a soundtrack of songs inspired by the film The Passion Of The Christ.

Winans performed a duet with Eden Espinosa on the 2008 Alma Awards which was broadcast on ABC on September 12. 2008.  Winans and Espinosa sang "I Don't Know Much" as a tribute to honoree Linda Ronstadt. Bebe performed "Born for This" on the Obama/Biden Inauguration tribute Change is Now CD+DVD set. BeBe & CeCe Winans had confirmed a reunion album scheduled for early 2009.

Winans hosts his own nationally syndicated radio program, The BeBe Winans Radio Show. BeBe Winans has starred in Broadway's The Color Purple as Harpo as of January 9, 2008. He is starring alongside Chaka Khan who is playing his wife, Sofia.

Winans was one of the judges for a gospel music competition show on BET called Sunday Best, along with gospel duo Mary Mary. He was invited to participate in the remake of "We Are The World" to benefit Haiti after the 2010 earthquake. Bebe together with Cece and Mary Mary featuring the West Angeles Choir performed on The Tonight Show with Jay Leno.

In 2012, Winans released The Whitney I Knew, a memoir about Whitney Houston, who had died earlier that year. Winans was a close friend of the singer, and sang at her funeral.

In March 2014, Winans joined British pop/R&B group Eternal at the Hammersmith Apollo in London, to perform the number one hit "I Wanna Be the Only One", as part of The Big Reunion live shows.

Legal issues
In November 2007, Winans filed suit in Davidson County, Tennessee against Eric Peterson, who had managed him between 2002 and 2007. Winans's claims included breach of a managerial contract and of fiduciary duties, as well as fraud. Winans asserted that Peterson stole from him and took advantage of his trust, stating that in February 2002, "Mr. Peterson induced Mr. Winans to execute a power of attorney, representing that it was required to permit Mr. Peterson to perform his services. In fact, on December 31, 2004, Mr. Peterson used the power of attorney to execute a promissory note purporting to obligate Mr. Winans to pay Mr. Peterson himself the sum of $150,000."

Winans was arrested March 11, 2009 on charges of domestic assault for allegedly pushing his ex-wife to the ground in front of their children during an argument. According to a court filing, Winans and his former spouse got into a "verbal altercation" on February 13 about "custody issues dealing with their children." On December 4, 2009, the domestic assault criminal charges against Winans were dismissed. An AP news report indicates the court action resulted from a pre-trial diversion deal offered by the prosecution, calling for Winans to attend domestic violence counseling in exchange for dismissal of the charges.

Discography

Solo albums
1997: BeBe Winans (Atlantic)
2000: Love & Freedom (Motown)
2002: Live and Up Close (Motown)
2004: My Christmas Prayer (The Movement Group / Hidden Beach / Epic)
2005: Dream (The Movement Group / Still Waters / Hidden Beach)
2007: Cherch (The Movement Group / Koch)
2012: America, America (My Destiny / Razor & Tie)
2019: Need You

As BeBe & CeCe Winans
1984: Lord Lift Us Up (PTL)
1987: BeBe & CeCe Winans (Sparrow / Capitol)
1988: Heaven (Sparrow / Capitol)
1991: Different Lifestyles (Sparrow / Capitol)
1993: First Christmas (Sparrow / Capitol)
1994: Relationships (Sparrow / Capitol)
1996: Greatest Hits (Sparrow / EMI)
2006: The Best of BeBe and CeCe (Sparrow)
2009: Still (B&C / Malaco)

Singles
1996: "All of Me" (Myrrh)
1997: "In Harm's Way" (Atlantic)
1997: "Thank You" (Atlantic)
1997: "I Wanna Be the Only One" (with Eternal) (EMI)
1997: "Stay" (Atlantic)
2000: "Coming Back Home" (Motown)
2000: "Jesus Children of America" (Motown)
2000: "Tonight Tonight" (Motown)
2002: "Do You Know Him" (Motown)
2005: "I Have a Dream" (TMG/Still Waters)
2005: "Safe from Harm" (TMG/Still Waters)
2005: "Love Me Anyway" (TMG/Still Waters)
2017: "He Promised Me" (Regimen/Malaco)
2018: "Laughter" (Regimen/Malaco)
2019: "Free Free" (Regimen/Malaco)
2020: "In Jesus Name" (Regimen/Malaco)
2020: "Black Lives Matter" (Hidden Beach)

Other appearances
1984: "Give Him Thanks" from Face to Face (Light) with The Winans
1984: "Golden Opportunity" from Tomorrow (Light) with The Winans
1984: Jesus Commands Us to Go!, Keith Green (background)
1986: "Its Only Natural" and "Arms of Love" from Kaleidoscope (Dayspring) with Keith Thomas
1987: "Abundant Life" from Ron Winans Family & Friends Choir Vol. I (Selah)
1987: "Love Is You" from Daniel Winans & Second Half (A&M) duet with Marvin Winans
1988: Live: Radically Saved, Carman (background)
1989: "Do You Feel Their Pain?" from Justice (Sparrow) duet with Steve Camp
1991: "A Song of Consecration" from Ron Winans Family & Friends Choir Vol. III (Selah)
1992: "I'm Going Up" from White Men Can't Jump (soundtrack) (EMI) with CeCe
1992: "Still Called Today" from The Great Adventure (Sparrow) with Steven Curtis Chapman
1993: "For Unto Us a Child Is Born" from The New Young Messiah (Sparrow) with CeCe
1994: "He's on Your Side", duet with Monique Walker on the Hezekiah Walker & The Love Fellowship Choir album, Live in Atlanta at Morehouse College (Benson)
1995: "You've Got a Friend" from Tapestry Revisited: A Tribute to Carole King (Atlantic) with CeCe and Aretha Franklin
1996: "All of Me" from My Utmost for His Highest: The Covenant (Myrrh)
1996: "But God" from Ron Winans Family & Friends Choir Vol. IV (Selah)
1997: "I Wanna Be the Only One" with Eternal from Before the Rain (Atlantic/EMI)
1998: "He's Coming Soon" from The Apocalypse (soundtrack) (Straightway)
1998: "River Jordan" from Civil War: The Nashville Sessions (Atlantic)
1998: "One Voice" from Never Say Never (Brandy) (Atlantic) 
1998: "Stay with Me" from The Prince of Egypt: Inspirational (DreamWorks)
1999: "He Watches Over You", duet with Sandi Patty from Songs from the Book (Word)
1999: "I Will Follow Christ", as a trio with Bob Carlisle and Clay Crosse
2001: "Jesus Children of America" with Marvin Winans and Stevie Wonder from Boycott (HBO Film soundtrack)
2006: "Broken Bridges" (CMT film) with Willie Nelson and Toby Keith
2007: "I Don't Want to Be Wrong Today" from We Are Family 2007: Artists & Friends for Hurricane Relief (Point of Light Foundation)
2010: "We Are the World 25 for Haiti"

Books
The Whitney I Knew, Worthy Publishing, July 2012

See also
The bebe & CeCe

References

External links
www.bebewinans.net - The official BeBe Winans Website

1962 births
Living people
20th-century American singers
21st-century American singers
20th-century African-American male singers
American gospel singers
American radio personalities
Singers from Detroit
Grammy Award winners
Motown artists
Pentecostals from Michigan
Performers of Christian contemporary R&B music
Urban contemporary gospel musicians
Winans family
20th-century American male singers
21st-century American male singers
21st-century African-American male singers